Netechma gilvoniveana is a species of moth of the family Tortricidae. It is found in Peru.

The wingspan is 21 mm. The ground colour of the forewings is cream, but whitish cream subterminally, in the median cell and subdorsally. The suffusions are pale ferruginous. The hindwings are white cream, but brownish on the periphery.

Etymology
The species name is derived from the Latin gilvus (meaning honey) and niveus (meaning white).

References

Moths described in 2010
Netechma